Madrid bombings may refer to:

Cafetería Rolando bombing, 1974
May 1979 Madrid bombing
July 1979 Madrid bombings
El Descanso bombing, April 1985
Madrid airline office attacks, July 1985
Plaza República Dominicana bombing, 1986
1992 Madrid bombing
1993 Madrid bombings
1995 Vallecas bombing
2000 Madrid bombing
2001 Madrid bombing
2004 Madrid train bombings
2006 Madrid-Barajas Airport bombing